The following is a list of games and competitions that test knowledge about primarily academic subjects.

 Quiz bowl
 Knowledge Bowl
 National History Bee and Bowl
 Reach for the Top
 College Bowl
 Academic Decathlon
 National Tournament of Academic Excellence  (NTAE)

See also 
 List of televised quiz bowl programs

Student quiz competitions